The 1952–53 NBA season was the Celtics' seventh season in the NBA.

Offseason

NBA Draft

Roster

Regular season

x = clinched playoff spot

Record vs. opponents

Game log

Playoffs

|- align="center" bgcolor="#ccffcc"
| 1
| March 19
| @ Syracuse
| W 87–81
| Bob Cousy (20)
| —
| Onondaga War Memorial
| 1–0
|- align="center" bgcolor="#ccffcc"
| 2
| March 21
| Syracuse
| W 111–105 (4OT)
| Bob Cousy (50)
| Macauley, Sharman (5)
| Boston Garden
| 2–0
|-

|- align="center" bgcolor="#ffcccc"
| 1
| March 25
| @ New York
| L 91–95
| Bob Cousy (28)
| Chuck Cooper (6)
| Madison Square Garden III
| 0–1
|- align="center" bgcolor="#ccffcc"
| 2
| March 26
| New York
| W 86–70
| Macauley, Cousy (21)
| Bob Cousy (13)
| Boston Garden
| 1–1
|- align="center" bgcolor="#ffcccc"
| 3
| March 28
| @ New York
| L 82–101
| Bob Cousy (18)
| Ed Macauley (5)
| Madison Square Garden III
| 1–2
|- align="center" bgcolor="#ffcccc"
| 4
| March 29
| New York
| L 75–82
| Ed Macauley (25)
| Bob Cousy (8)
| Boston Garden
| 1–3
|-

Player statistics

Season

Playoffs

Awards and records
 Ed Macauley, All-NBA First Team
 Bob Cousy, All-NBA First Team
 Bill Sharman, All-NBA Second Team

Transactions

References

See also
 1952-53 NBA season

Boston Celtics seasons
Boston Celtics
Boston Celtics
Boston Celtics
1950s in Boston